The Javan woodcock (Scolopax saturata) or rufous woodcock is a small wader restricted to wet mountain forests on Sumatra and western Java. It nests on a bed of moss in light undergrowth. It has a "roding" display flight like Eurasian woodcock, but the calls are different.

It is smaller than Eurasian woodcock, and has much darker plumage. It was formerly considered to be conspecific with the New Guinea woodcock and called collectively the dusky woodcock.

References

Further reading
Shorebirds by Hayman, Marchant and Prater, 

Scolopax
Wading birds
Birds described in 1821
Taxa named by Thomas Horsfield